David McFarland (born Dec 31, 1938) is a ethologist and writer, he's scientist specializing in the field of animal behavior and more recently the broadening of this understanding to "artificial ethology" and robotics. He was educated at Leighton Park School, the Quaker school at Reading. He later taught at Balliol College, Oxford. He is the author of a number of books, including Animal Behaviour: Psychobiology, Ethology, and Evolution, and Companion to Animal Behaviour, published by Oxford University Press. He is also the author of the Dictionary of Animal Behaviour, published by Oxford Paperback Reference in 2006.

Bibliography 
Newest publications are listed first.
 Guilty Robots, Happy Dogs: The Question of Alien Minds (Oxford University Press, USA, 2008), 
 Dictionary of Animal Behaviour (Oxford University Press, USA, 2006) 
 Animal Behaviour : Psychology, Ethology and Evolution. (Pitman, 1985.) 
 * Animal Behaviour: Psychobiology, Ethology and Evolution (Benjamin Cummings, 1998), 
 Intelligent Behavior in Animals and Robots (Complex Adaptive Systems) (The MIT Press, 1993), 
 Le comportement animal (French & European Pubns, 1990) 
 Problems of Animal Behaviour (Harlow, Essex; New York: Longman Scientific & Technical, Wiley, 1989), 
 Oxford Companion to Animal Behavior (Oxford University Press, USA, 1982), 
 Quantitative ethology: The state space approach (Boston: Pitman, 1981), 
 Feedback Mechanisms in Animal Behaviour (London: Academic Press, 1971),

Notes

External links 
Guilty Robots, Happy Dogs: The Question of Alien Minds by David McFarland - TimesOnline
Dictionary of Animal Behaviour - Oxford University Press

 Decision time for animals / Review of 'Problems of Animal Behaviour' by David McFarland - NewScientist 
Short biography at chapters.indigo.ca
David McFarland: Guilty Robots, Happy Dogs - The Question of Alien Minds - review by Berel Dov Lerner, Western Galilee College, Israel

Year of birth missing (living people)
Fellows of Balliol College, Oxford
Living people
Ethologists